Venezuelan Fiesta  is a 33-RPM LP album by Venezuelan composer/arranger/conductor Aldemaro Romero, released in 1956, under contract with RCA Victor.

This was the second Romero's album with RCA Victor, featuring popular Venezuelan pieces, and the release of the joropo Venezuelan Fiesta, continuing with the modernization of Venezuelan folk music, upgrading it from folk instrumentations to full modern orchestral versions, and making it palatable to international audiences.

Album information
From the back cover of the album:

Las Bellas Noches de Maiquetía — Valse Venezolano (The Beautiful Nights of Maiquetía). "This composition by Pedro Arcila Ponte was inspired by the beauty of the nights of Maiquetía, a seaport near La Guaira."
Brisas del Zulia — Valse (Breezes of Zulia). "This is a musical tribute to Lake Maracaibo, written by Amable Espina."
Geranio — Valse (Geranium). "Written by one of Venezuela's foremost composers, Pedro Elías Gutiérrez, who also wrote the famous joropo Alma Llanera. The Vienna style is predominant."
Amalia — Valse-Joropo. "A very famous valse-joropo written by Francisco de Paula Aguirre and Leoncio Martínez "Leo"."
El Cari-Cari — Joropo. "One of the standard favorites of the country."
El Cumaco de San Juan — Merengue. "A typical merengue from Caracas."
El Polo Coriano — Polo. "An outstanding example of this type of music."

Track listing

See also 
Venezuela
Aldemaro Romero
Venezuelan music

1956 albums
Aldemaro Romero albums
RCA Records albums
Albums produced by Aldemaro Romero